The inquisitive shrew mole (Uropsilus investigator) is a species of mammal in the family Talpidae. It is only known from Yunnan province of China, although its range is thought to extend over the border into Myanmar.

A 2018 phylogenetic study found U. investigator to be the most basal species in the genus Uropsilus, diverging from the rest of the genus during the late Miocene.

References

Sources

Mammals of China
Mammals of Myanmar
Uropsilus
EDGE species
Mammals described in 1922
Taxa named by Oldfield Thomas
Taxonomy articles created by Polbot